The Vernon Canadians were a men's ice hockey team from Vernon, British Columbia that played in the Okanagan Mainline League or the Okanagan Senior League from 1949 to 1961. In 1962, after the Okanagan Senior League folded, the Canadians became a beer league team and then an “old timers” team that still plays today.

The Vernon Canadians won the 1956 Allan Cup, becoming the national senior ice hockey champions. This made them Canada's representative for the 1957 World Ice Hockey Championships, but the tournaments was being held in Moscow, and western nations boycotted them in protest over the Soviet Union's invasion of Hungary in 1956.

They were the Western Canada senior champion one more time, losing in the 1959 Allan Cup national finals to the Whitby Dunlops.

Season-by-season record

Okanagan Mainline League
 Season	Games	Won	Lost	Tied	Points	GoalsFor GoalsAgainst	Standing	Playoffs	
 1949–50	48	21	25	2	-	215	237	4th	out of playoffs	
 1950–51	55	17	38	0	-	220	297	4th	Lost Final

Okanagan Senior League
 Season	Games	Won	Lost	Tied	Points	GoalsFor	GoalsAgainst	Standing	Playoffs	
 1951–52	50	27	23	0	54	-	-	2nd	Lost Semi Final	
 1952–53	54	20	31	3	43	203	262	4th	Lost Semi Final	
 1953–54	64	25	36	3	53	281	311	4th	Lost Semi Final	
 1954–55	54	27	24	3	57	212	198	2nd	Won Final, Won Province, Lost West Final	
 1955–56	56	37	17	2	76	-	-	1st	Won Final, Won Province, Won West, Won Allan Cup	
 1956–57	54	32	19	3	67	269	221	1st	Won Final, Lost Province	
 1957–58	54	24	29	1	49	228	257	3rd	Lost Semi Final	
 1958–59	54	25	25	4	54	244	269	2nd	Won Final, Won Province, Won West, Lost Allan Cup	
 1959–60	47	37	9	1	75	305	160	1st	Lost Final	
 1960–61	51	32	19	0	-	331	264	1st	Won Final, Lost Province

Notable alumni
Dick Butler
Marcel Dheere
Dave Gatherum
Johnny Harms
Bing Juckes
Frank King
Odie Lowe
Dave MacKay
Connie Madigan
Doug McKay
Jim McLeod
Jack Miller
Alex Ritson
George Agar
Walt Trentini
Tom Stecyk
Hal Gordon
Orv Lavell
Willie Schmidt
Merv Bidoski
Art Hart
Don McLeod

References

Ice hockey teams in British Columbia
Sport in Vernon, British Columbia